Brunei joined ASEAN on 7 January 1984, one week after resuming full independence, and gives its ASEAN membership the highest priority in its foreign relations. Brunei joined the United Nations in September 1984. It is also a member of the Organisation of Islamic Cooperation (OIC), the Asia-Pacific Economic Cooperation (APEC) forum and the Commonwealth of Nations. Brunei hosted the APEC Economic Leaders' Meeting in November 2000. In 2005 it attended the inaugural East Asia Summit.

Brunei has a number of diplomatic missions abroad and has close relations with Singapore, sharing an interchangeable currency regime as well as close military relations with the latter island-state. Aside from relations with other ASEAN states, of which the Philippines, Indonesia, and Malaysia are key partners, Brunei also has extensive relations with the Muslim world and the Arab world outside its own region.

International organizations

Brunei became a member state of the Commonwealth in 1984, ASEAN, the United Nations and the Organisation of Islamic Cooperation, in 1984, a major player in BIMP-EAGA in 1994., and a founding member of the World Trade Organization (WTO) in 1995. Since 2009, Brunei and the Philippines signed a memorandum of understanding (MOU) that seeks to strengthen the bilateral co-operation of the two countries in the fields of agriculture and farm-related trade and investments.

Brunei and the Commonwealth of Nations 

Brunei has been a fully independent member state of the Commonwealth of Nations since 1 January 1984, when it regained independence, having been under British protection and suzerainty since 1888.

Brunei is, along with Lesotho, Malaysia, Swaziland, and Tonga, a monarchy with its own monarch, the Sultan of Brunei.

Bruneians can take an appeal to the Judicial Committee of the Privy Council in London in civil cases only. The Judicial Committee of the Privy Council reports back to the Sultan in cases originating from the courts of Brunei.

Bilateral relations

See also

 List of diplomatic missions in Brunei
 List of diplomatic missions of Brunei
 Visa requirements for Bruneian citizens

References 

 
Brunei and the Commonwealth of Nations